The 1990–91 Pittsburgh Panthers men's basketball team represented the University of Pittsburgh in the 1990–91 NCAA Division I men's basketball season. Led by head coach Paul Evans, the Panthers finished with a record of 21–12. They received an at-large bid to the 1991 NCAA Division I men's basketball tournament where they lost in the second round to Kansas.

References

Pittsburgh Panthers men's basketball seasons
Pittsburgh
Pittsburgh Pan
Pittsburgh Pan
Pittsburgh